Joseph Jason Putz (born February 22, 1977) is an American former professional baseball relief pitcher. He played in Major League Baseball (MLB) for the Seattle Mariners, New York Mets, Chicago White Sox and Arizona Diamondbacks.

High school and college
Born in Trenton, Michigan, Putz led Trenton High School to the 1994 Class B state championship.  He graduated in 1995 and won the Mr. Baseball award for the state of Michigan. Putz attended the University of Michigan, and played collegiate summer baseball in the Cape Cod Baseball League for the Yarmouth-Dennis Red Sox in 1997 and the Hyannis Mets in 1998.

Professional career

Seattle Mariners
Putz was drafted by the Mariners in the 6th round in 1999. He made his Major League debut with the Mariners on August 11, . In , he became the closer for the Mariners.

All through the minors, Putz had been able to throw an excellent fastball that topped out at 97 miles per hour, but had been only marginally successful because his only other pitch was a below average slider. His first few years in the majors were not terrible, but they were also nothing special. In spring training before the  season, Eddie Guardado, who had been the Mariners' closer since , taught him to throw a splitter. After mastering the new secondary pitch, Putz abandoned his slider and became a much improved pitcher.

A few weeks into the 2006 season, Putz took over the closing job from the aging Guardado. He converted 36 of 43 save opportunities while posting a 2.30 ERA and striking out 104 in 78.1 innings of work.

In 2007, Putz continued to improve his game. He made his first All-Star appearance, where he was given a save opportunity. He converted 40 saves in 42 save opportunities with a 1.38 ERA, 0.698 WHIP, 82 strikeouts and 13 walks in  innings. On July 6, 2007, he was named the June 2007 winner of the "DHL Presents the Major League Baseball Delivery Man of the Month Award", recognizing the top relief pitcher for the month and on September 25, 2007, Putz was named as one of 10 finalists for the "DHL Presents the Major League Baseball Delivery Man of the Year Award." On July 14, 2007, Putz broke Eddie Guardado's Mariners' consecutive saves record. The streak ended at 30 consecutive saves. In 2007, he also became the first Mariner ever to win the Rolaids Relief Man of the Year Award.

New York Mets
On December 10, 2008, Putz was part of a three-team, twelve-player trade that sent him to the New York Mets in exchange for pitcher Aaron Heilman, utility outfielder Endy Chávez, and prospects. He made his Mets debut on April 6,  against the Cincinnati Reds, pitching a hitless inning. After a disappointing 2009 season, on November 6, the Mets declined to exercise Putz's 2010 team option, thus making him a free agent.

Chicago White Sox
On December 11, 2009, Putz signed a one-year contract with the Chicago White Sox worth $3 million. On July 20, 2010, Putz set a Chicago White Sox franchise record by pitching 25 consecutive scoreless outings.

Arizona Diamondbacks
On December 7, 2010, the Arizona Diamondbacks agreed to sign Putz to a 2-year, $10 million deal with a $6.5 million club option for 2013. He earned $4 million in 2011, $4.5 million in 2012, and his option had a $1.5 million buyout.

On October 20, 2012, the Diamondbacks exercised his $6.5 million option. On June 20, 2014, Putz was designated for assignment. He was released on June 27. Putz rejoined the Diamondbacks as a special assistant to club president Derrick Hall in November.

Pitching style
Putz threw a mix of five pitches. He led with four-seam and two-seam fastballs (the latter to lefties, mainly) that were once in the upper 90s, but had settled in the 90–94 mph range. His main off-speed pitch was a splitter in the mid 80s. He also threw a handful of cutters and sliders, primarily to right-handed hitters.

Personal life
Putz was first nicknamed "The Big Guy", by Seattle Mariners broadcaster Dave Niehaus. Putz shared a dorm with New England Patriots quarterback Tom Brady while at the University of Michigan. He married Kelsey Kollen-Putz in 2002, with whom he has four children; twin daughters Lauren and Kaelyn, son Ethan, and daughter Addison.

See also

References

External links

1977 births
Living people
American League All-Stars
Arizona Diamondbacks players
Arizona League Diamondbacks players
Arizona League Mariners players
Baseball players from Michigan
Chicago White Sox players
Everett AquaSox players
Hyannis Harbor Hawks players
Major League Baseball pitchers
Michigan Wolverines baseball players
New York Mets players
People from Trenton, Michigan
Reno Aces players
San Antonio Missions players
Seattle Mariners players
Tacoma Rainiers players
Wisconsin Timber Rattlers players
World Baseball Classic players of the United States
Yarmouth–Dennis Red Sox players
2009 World Baseball Classic players